Melochia umbellata is a species of flowering plant in the mallow family, Malvaceae.  Its specific epithet comes from the Latin umbellatus (umbel-like), referring to the inflorescence.

Description

Melochia umbellata is a shrub or small tree, growing to 2–15 m in height.  It grows rapidly and is able to colonise disturbed land.  It has large, broadly ovate, leaves 90–300 mm long.  The flowers are usually pale pink to red.  The seeds are winged and wind-dispersed.

Distribution and habitat
The plant is native to a region extending from India eastwards through Southeast Asia to north-western Australia and New Guinea.  It occurs in secondary vegetation and forest clearings, on rocky slopes and along the edges of rivers and forests, often in seasonally dry soil.

It has been introduced elsewhere and is cultivated widely to provide shade for young trees in timber and coffee plantations. Melochia is relished by ruminants when offered as a cut-and-carry feed. It has become an invasive weed on the Island of Hawaii where it was extensively planted in the Hilo area during a 1920s reforestation program.

References

Notes

Sources

External links

Byttnerioideae
Plants described in 1913
Flora of tropical Asia
Flora of Christmas Island
Flora of Western Australia